Caberini is a tribe of geometrid moths in the family Geometridae. There are at least 50 described species in Caberini.

Taxonomic note:
Molecular analyses by Sihvonen et al. (2011) supports separating the tribe Baptini from the Caberini. Research by Pitkin (2002) supports the view that Caberini and Baptini should be united, but notes that further study of immature stages is needed.

Genera
 Aplogompha Warren, 1897
 Apodrepanulatrix Rindge, 1949
 Aspilobapta Djakonov, 1952
 Cabera Treitschke, 1825
 Chloraspilates Packard, 1876
 Covellia Ferguson, 2009
 Drepanulatrix Gumppenberg, 1887
 Episemasia Hulst, 1896
 Erastria Hübner, 1813
 Eudrepanulatrix Rindge, 1949
 Ilexia Ferguson, 2009
 Ixala Hulst, 1896
 Numia Guenée, 1858
 Parilexia Ferguson, 2009
 Pterospoda Dyar, 1903
 Rhinodia Guenée, 1857
 Sericosema Warren, 1895
 Sphacelodes Guenée, 1858
 Stergamataea Hulst, 1896
 Thysanopyga Herrich-Schäffer, 1855

References

 Hodges, R. W., et al., eds. (1983). Check List of the Lepidoptera of America North of Mexico: Including Greenland, 284.
 Pitkin, Linda M. (2002). "Neotropical ennomine moths: a review of the genera (Lepidoptera: Geometridae)". Zoological Journal of the Linnean Society, vol. 135, no. 2-3, 121-401.
 Sihvonen, Pasi, Marko Mutanen, Lauri Kaila, Gunnar Brehm, Axel Hausmann, and Herman S. Staude (2011). "Comprehensive molecular sampling yields a robust phylogeny for Geometrid moths (Lepidoptera: Geometridae)". PLoS One, vol. 6, no. 6, 11.

Further reading

External links

 Butterflies and Moths of North America

 
Ennominae